Ha Chanseok (December 20, 1948 – September 14, 2010) was a professional Go player.

Biography 
Ha became an 8 dan in 1987, and 9 dan in 2003.

Titles & runners-up

References

External links
GoBase Profile
Sensei's Library

1948 births
2010 deaths
South Korean Go players